The 1990 NHK Trophy was held in Asahikawa on November 20–25. Medals were awarded in the disciplines of men's singles, ladies' singles, pair skating, and ice dancing.

Results

Men

Ladies

Pairs

Ice dancing

External links
 1990 NHK Trophy

Nhk Trophy, 1990
NHK Trophy